Carpaneto Piacentino is a comune (municipality) in the Province of Piacenza in the Italian region of Emilia-Romagna, located about  northwest of Bologna and about  southeast of Piacenza. 

Sights include the Badagnano Castle and the Olmeto Castle, both located in the frazione of Badagnano.

Carpaneto Piacentino borders the following municipalities: Cadeo, Castell'Arquato, Fiorenzuola d'Arda, Gropparello, Lugagnano Val d'Arda, Pontenure, San Giorgio Piacentino.

References

External links

Cities and towns in Emilia-Romagna